Mustapha Doballah (born 25 April 1959) is an Algerian handball player. He competed in the men's tournament at the 1984 Summer Olympics. He also took part in three World Men's Handball Championship on 1982, 1986 and 1990. He played with MC Oran HB.

References

External links
 

1959 births
Living people
Algerian male handball players
Olympic handball players of Algeria
Handball players at the 1984 Summer Olympics
Sportspeople from Oran
MC Oran Handball players
21st-century Algerian people